The Sweet Home Valley of the South Santiam River runs from an area known as The Narrows near the western edge of the city of Sweet Home, Oregon to the confluence of the South Santiam and Middle Santiam rivers at Foster Reservoir on the east.  Extending on either side of the South Santiam, nearly all of the valley south of the river is inside the city of Sweet Home while the valley north of the river remains unincorporated.  Prior to the construction of Foster Dam, the area inundated by Foster Reservoir was occupied by several ranches and farms.

Valleys of Oregon
Landforms of Linn County, Oregon